Benoy Upreti (born 1 September 1986) is an Indian cricketer. He made his Twenty20 debut on 9 November 2019, for Sikkim in the 2019–20 Syed Mushtaq Ali Trophy.

References

External links
 

1986 births
Living people
Indian cricketers
Sikkim cricketers
People from Gangtok